Calabro may refer to:

 Calabro (surname)

Places
 Aiello Calabro
 Belmonte Calabro
 Campo Calabro
 Corigliano Calabro
 Monterosso Calabro
 Morano Calabro
 Paterno Calabro
 San Costantino Calabro
 Soriano Calabro